Astrotech Corporation, formerly Spacehab Inc., is a technology incubator headquartered in Austin, Texas. Astrotech uses technology sourced internally and from research institutions, government laboratories, and universities to fund, manage and sell start-up companies.

Astrotech Corporation's subsidiaries provide commercial products and services to NASA, the U.S. Department of Defense, national space agencies, and global commercial customers.

History

Astrotech Corporation
Astrotech Corporation was established in 1984. Prior to 2009, it was known as SPACEHAB, Inc., a company that provided space habitat microgravity experimentation equipment and services to NASA during the Space Shuttle era. As the Shuttle program came to an end, the company put more focus on its spacecraft processing business, Astrotech Space Operations, Inc. (ASO), its mass spectrometer instrumentation business, 1st Detect, Inc. and its microgravity vaccine development company, Astrogenetix, Inc. In August 2014, the company sold Astrotech Space Operations. In February 2015, the company acquired defect correction software and Astral Images Corp. was created to commercialize government funded satellite imagery processing technology and research into automated image correction and enhancement.

Spacehab

Spacehab was founded in 1984 by Bob Citron with the help and support of CSP Associates from Cambridge, Massachusetts. The team from CSP Associates included founder David W. Lippy along with his partners Brad Meslin and Marc Oderman. It was one of CSP's consultants, Dr. David Williamson who conceived of the idea to increase the cargo space on the Shuttles as the primary focus of the Spacehab mission. Early venture capital was supplied by Al Zesiger of BEA Associates in New York City as well as Dr. Shelley Harrison also from New York. CSP Associates and its venture contacts were responsible for raising most of the early seed monies to get the company off the ground and funded. Throughout its more than 20-year history, Spacehab has contracted over $1 billion dollars in total sales.

Spacehab hardware for Space Shuttle missions
Spacehab hardware consists of:
 Integrated Cargo Carrier (ICC), unpressurized
 External Stowage Platform (ESP-2 and ESP-3), an ICC variant
 Logistics Single Module (LSM) and Logistics Double Module (LDM)
 Single Module (SM) and Research Double Module (RDM), pressurized

The Spacehab hardware was specifically designed to be nestled inside the cargo bay of the Space Shuttles and flew on a total of 22 Space Shuttle missions, including seven to the Russian space station Mir and eight to the International Space Station (ISS). The Single Module flew on seven missions, and the Research Double Module flew only on the ill-fated Columbia STS-107 mission, in which it was destroyed.

The inaugural flight of Spacehab's research double module, which launched January 2003 on STS-107, ended when the Space Shuttle Columbia broke up during re-entry. In January 2004, Spacehab filed a formal claim against NASA for the amount of $87.7 million for the loss caused by the Columbia disaster. In February 2003 Spacehab received $17.7 million from the proceeds of its commercial insurance policy, and in October 2004 NASA paid the company $8.2 million. In February 2007, Spacehab dropped all litigation against NASA.

Spacehab's ICC hardware has been further developed into the External Stowage Platform (ESP-2 and ESP-1), which are permanently deployed on the ISS. The ESP-2 is currently attached to the International Space Station's airlock, providing the only permanent, commercial "spare parts" facility for the ISS crew. ESP-3 was deployed during Space Shuttle mission STS-118, on August 8, 2007.

Flights

Legend:
ESP - External Stowage Platform
ICC - Integrated Cargo Carrier
LDM - Logistics Double Module
LSM - Logistics Single Module
SM - Single Module
RDM - Research Double Module

Astrotech Space Operations (ASO)
The Company changed its name to Astrotech Corporation in 2009 to align the corporate name with the company's core business offering, Astrotech Space Operation. ASO provides all support necessary for government and commercial customers to successfully process their satellite hardware for launch–including planning; construction and use of unique equipment and facilities; and spacecraft checkout, encapsulation, fueling, and transport.

Astrotech Corporation management sold ASO, its state-of-the-art satellite servicing operations, to Lockheed Martin in August 2014.

Products and services

Chemical detection and analysis
1st Detect, an Astrotech subsidiary, develops, manufactures, and sells powerful, highly sensitive, and accurate mass spectrometers that can be used in explosive and chemical warfare detection for the Department of Homeland Security and the military. 1st Detect's miniature mass spectrometer technology was sourced from Oak Ridge Laboratory's chemical analyzer research.

The company Astrotech Corporation (NASDAQ: ASTC) announced that its Astrotech Technologies, Inc. subsidiary has entered into an agreement with Sanmina Corporation to manufacture its mass spectrometry products. As part of the relationship, Sanmina will manufacture 1st Detect’s TRACER 1000. They have also agreed to manufacture AgLAB’s AgLAB-1000 and BreathTech’s BreathTest-1000 once those products are officially released.

Film restoration, correction, and enhancement
Astral Images sells film to digital image enhancement, defect removal and color correction software, and post processing services, providing economically feasible conversion of television and feature 35mm and 16mm films to the new 4K ultra-high definition (UHD), high-dynamic range (HDR) format necessary for the new generation of digital distribution. Astral Images' core technology is sourced from decades of image research from the laboratories of IBM and Kodak combined with classified satellite technology from government laboratories.

Vaccine development
Sourced from NASA's extensive microgravity research, Astrogenetix is applying a fast-track on-orbit discovery platform using the International Space Station to develop vaccines and other therapeutics.

Space operations 

Prior to the 2014 Lockheed Martin acquisition, Astrotech provided both the government and commercial space markets with satellite processing services through its Astrotech Space Operations (ASO) subsidiary located in Titusville, Florida, three miles (5 km) from the Kennedy Space Center. Astrotech owned and operated processing facilities located on Vandenberg Space Force Base at the Western Range in California. Also in California, ASO provides payload processing and facilities management support for the ocean-going Sea Launch program at the Home Port Facilities in Long Beach.

ARCTUS 
On December 10, 2007, Spacehab released details about its upcoming Advanced Research and Conventional Technology Utilization Spacecraft designed to deliver cargo to, and return cargo from, the International Space Station. The project was later shelved.

References

External links 

 Official Astrotech Corporation web site
 ARCTUS Spacecraft home page
 Encyclopedia Astronautica entry

Companies based in Austin, Texas
Aerospace companies of the United States
Technology companies of the United States
American companies established in 1984
1984 establishments in Texas
Technology companies established in 1984